Anna Vasilyevna Chapman (born Anna Vasilyevna Kushchenko on 23 February 1982) is a Russian intelligence agent, media personality and model who was arrested in the United States on 27 June 2010 as part of the Illegals Program spy ring. At the time of her arrest, she was accused of espionage on behalf of the Russian Federation's external intelligence agency, the Sluzhba vneshney razvedki (SVR).
She had previously gained British citizenship through marriage, which she used to gain residency in the U.S.

Chapman pleaded guilty to a charge of conspiracy to act as an agent of a foreign government. She and the other Russians were deported to Russia on 8 July 2010, as part of the 2010 Russia–U.S. prisoner swap. Learning that Chapman had wanted to return to the United Kingdom, the UK government revoked her British citizenship and excluded her from the country.

Since her return to Russia, Chapman has worked in a variety of fields, including for the government as head of a youth council, a catwalk model in Russian fashion shows, and running a television series.

Early life
Chapman was born Anna Vasilyevna Kushchenko in Kharkiv on 23 February 1982. Her father was a senior KGB official employed in the Soviet embassy in Nairobi, Kenya. The family's home is located in Moscow's south-west Ramenki District, a once-elite district for KGB officials, mid-ranking diplomats, and army officers. According to Komsomolskaya Pravda, Kushchenko occupies a senior position at the ministry known by its Russian initials MID (foreign affairs).  According to her ex-husband, Anna earned a master's degree in economics with first class honours from Moscow State University. According to other sources, she got her degree from Peoples' Friendship University of Russia.

London: 2001–2006
Anna Kushchenko met Alex Chapman at a London Docklands rave party in 2001. They married shortly thereafter in Moscow, and she gained British citizenship, in addition to her native Russian one, and a British passport.

In 2003 or 2004, Anna Chapman moved to London where she worked at NetJets, Barclays.

Anna and Alex Chapman divorced in 2006. In March 2018, it was reported that Alex Chapman had died in May 2015, aged 36, from a drug overdose.

New York: 2009–2010

In 2009, Chapman moved to New York, taking up residence at 20 Exchange Place, one block from Wall Street in Manhattan. Her LinkedIn social networking site profile identified her as CEO of PropertyFinder LLC, a website selling real estate internationally. Her husband Alex stated that Anna told him the enterprise was continually in debt for the first couple of years. But suddenly in 2009, she had as many as 50 employees and a successful business.

Chapman was reportedly in a relationship with Michel Bittan, a divorced Israeli-Moroccan restaurant owner, while she was living in New York. Around this time, she had allegedly attempted to purchase ecstasy tablets. She later described her time in the United States with the Charles Dickens quote, "it was the best of times, it was the worst of times".

After Anna was arrested in New York on charges of spying, Alex hired media publicist Max Clifford, and sold her story to The Daily Telegraph. She pleaded guilty to conspiracy to act as an agent of a foreign government without notifying the U.S. Attorney General. In 2010 she was deported to Russia as part of a prisoner exchange between the United States and Russia.

Russia: 2010–present
In late December 2010, Chapman was appointed to the public council of Young Guard of United Russia. According to the organization, she would "be engaged in educating young people".

On 21 January 2011, Chapman began hosting a weekly TV show in Russia called Secrets of the World for REN TV. In June 2011, Chapman was appointed as editor of Venture Business News magazine, according to Bloomberg News.

Chapman testified to the closed trial in absentia of Col. Alexander Poteyev, an ex-KGB soldier, which took place in Moscow in May and June 2011. Chapman testified that only Poteyev could have provided the U.S. authorities with the information that led to her arrest in 2010; she also alleged that she was arrested shortly after an undercover U.S. agent contacted her using a code that only Poteyev and her personal handler would have known.

Chapman wrote a column for Komsomolskaya Pravda. In October 2011, she was accused of plagiarizing material on Alexander Pushkin from a book by Kremlin spin doctor Oleg Matveychev. The Guardian reported that this incident added to general negative opinions of her in certain sections of Russian society; it said that in September 2011, she had been "heckled during a speech on leadership at St Petersburg University". Students had, it said, displayed signs stating: "Chapman, get out of the university!", and "The Kremlin and the porn studio are in the other direction!"

In 2012, FBI counter-intelligence chief Frank Figliuzzi said that Chapman almost caught a senior member of President Barack Obama's cabinet in a honey trap operation. Subsequent reporting suggested that these initial reports were inaccurate; officials from the US Department of Justice claimed that the FBI's concern was that another of the alleged spies, Cynthia Murphy, "had been in contact with a fundraiser and 'personal friend' of Hillary Clinton".

Armenia and Nagorno-Karabakh: 2013–present

Chapman had been sighted in the Armenian breakaway region of Nagorno Karabakh in August 2013. She arrived with a group of Russian officials to discuss issues with the Republic of Artsakh to resolve their conflict with Azerbaijan over the territory. She reportedly was also working on her television show, Mysteries of the World. Her visit caused an outcry in Azerbaijan; its foreign ministry declared that Chapman and the other Russian visitors would be classified as personae-non-gratae in Azerbaijan.

Chapman later visited Tsitsernakaberd, a memorial in Armenia dedicated to the victims of the Armenian genocide. She said in an interview that her visit to Armenia taught her the importance of family relationships, and that her best friends were Armenians. She said that she was impressed by the family values expressed in Armenian society, saying that Russian society lacked that, and she was learning a lot from Armenia.

Illegals Program and arrest

Chapman is one of only two of the Illegals Program Russians arrested in June 2010 who did not use an assumed name.

Arrest
Officials claimed Chapman worked with a network of others, until an undercover FBI agent attempted to draw her into a trap at a Manhattan coffee shop. The FBI agent offered Chapman a fake passport, with instructions to forward it to another spy. He asked, "Are you ready for this step?" to which Chapman replied, "Of course." She accepted the passport. But, after making a series of phone calls to her father Vasily Kushchenko in Moscow, Chapman took his advice and handed the passport in at a local police station. She was arrested shortly after.

International exchange
After being formally charged, Chapman and nine other detainees became part of a spy swap deal between the United States and Russia, the biggest of its kind since 1986. The ten Russian agents returned to Russia via a chartered jet that landed at Vienna International Airport in Austria, where the swap occurred on the morning of 8 July 2010. The Russian jet returned to Moscow's Domodedovo Airport where, after landing, the ten spies were kept away from local and international press.

Revocation of UK citizenship
According to a statement from her US lawyer Robert Baum and media reports, Chapman had wanted to move to the UK. The Home Office exercised special powers via the British Home Secretary to revoke Chapman's British citizenship to prevent her return to the UK. This was done under section 40 of the British Nationality Act 1981, introduced as part of the Nationality, Immigration and Asylum Act 2002 and Immigration, Asylum and Nationality Act 2006. This power had at that point only been used against a dozen people since its introduction. The Home Office issued legal papers revoking her citizenship on 13 July 2010. Steps were taken to exclude Chapman, meaning she could not travel to the UK. After Chapman's departure to Russia, Baum reiterated that his client had wished to stay in the UK; he also said that she was "particularly upset" by the revocation of her UK citizenship and exclusion from the country.

Media coverage and popular reaction
After her arrest by the FBI for her part in the Illegals Program, Chapman gained celebrity status. Photos of Chapman taken from her Facebook profile appeared on the web, and several videos of her were uploaded to YouTube. Her affiliation with the Russian Federation led at least one media outlet to refer to her as "the Red under the bed."

FundserviceBank, a Moscow bank that handles payments on behalf of state- and private-sector enterprises in the Russian aerospace industry has employed Chapman as an adviser on investment and innovation issues to the President.

Magazines and blogs detailed Chapman's fashion style and dress sense, while tabloids displayed her action figure dolls. Chapman was described by local media in New York as "stunning" and a regular of exclusive bars and restaurants. US Vice President Joe Biden, when jokingly asked by Jay Leno on NBC's The Tonight Show with Jay Leno, "Do we have any spies that hot?", replied jokingly, "Let me be clear. It was not my idea to send her back."

As a model, Chapman posed on the cover of Russian version of Maxim magazine in Agent Provocateur lingerie. The magazine included Chapman in its list of "Russia's 100 sexiest women." Chapman has also made an appearance as a runway model for Moscow Fashion Week at the Shiyan & Rudkovskaya show in 2011, and for Antalya at the Dosso Dossi in 2012.

Chapman has parlayed her media capital through Twitter, where she asked Edward Snowden to marry her, and on Instagram, which she has used to voice her political opinions.

See also
Albrecht Dittrich
Maria Butina

References

External links

 "To Russia With Plea", Smoking Gun. – refers to United States v. Anna Chapman, no. 10 Cr. 598, (S.D.N.Y 8 July 2010)
 US vs Anna Chapman Complaint (Archive)

1982 births
Living people
Foreign Intelligence Service (Russia) officers
People deported from the United Kingdom
People deported from the United States
Peoples' Friendship University of Russia alumni
Russian emigrants to the United Kingdom
Russian expatriates in the United States
Russian spies
2010 in Russia
REN TV
Women spies